Rustaq Airport  is an airport serving the city of Rustaq in Oman. Also known as a staging post for RAF planes into Afghanistan and also other military Strategic points.

Runway length does not include  displaced thresholds on both ends.

See also
List of airports in Oman
Transport in Oman

References

External links
 OurAirports - Rustaq Airport
 OpenStreetMap - Al Mussanah Airbase
 

Airports in Oman